Stephen Schaffer is a film editor who has worked on several films produced by Pixar. At the 59th American Cinema Editors Awards, he won an ACE Award for Best Edited Feature Film – Comedy or Musical for WALL-E; this marked the first time the award went to the editor of an animated film.

Filmography as editor
Incredibles 2 (2018)
The Good Dinosaur (2015)
Cars 2 (2011)
WALL-E (2008)
Cars (2006) (race sequence editor and additional voices)
Jack-Jack Attack (2005) (short)
The Incredibles (2004)
Osmosis Jones (2001)

Awards and nominations

ACE Awards
WALL-E (2008), won (Best Edited Feature Film – Comedy or Musical)
The Good Dinosaur (2015), nominated (Best Edited Feature Film – Comedy or Musical)
The Incredibles (2004), nominated (Best Edited Feature Film – Comedy or Musical)

OFCS Award for Best Editing
WALL-E (2008), nominated

References

External links

American film editors
Living people
Pixar people
Year of birth missing (living people)